The ChampCar Endurance Series is a budget class endurance race held on paved road race courses across North America, formerly known as the ChumpCar World Series, run by ChumpCar International Inc. Founded in 2009, the range changed its name in 2017, with registered trademark granted by the USPTO on August 28, 2018. Chumpcar was a parody of the now defunct Champ Car World Series, an open wheel professional racing series that has since developed into the Indycar Series. The initial concept was an endurance racing series for cars of $500 in value or less similar to the 24 Hours of LeMons endurance racing series. The series has a different overall philosophy, however, placing more emphasis on racing and less on decorations, costumes, and themes.  ChumpCar's slogan is "Real Racing, Real Tracks, Real Cheap Cars", and its stated mission, as stated on its website, is to be "It's all about racing. It's all about tearing down those high-dollar roadblocks that, in the past, have restricted people with a passion for cars and racing from getting fully engaged and involved in motorsports. It's about enjoyment, friends and bringing road racing back to where it was fifty years ago - when racing was fun, cheap and nobody cared whether you had Snap-On tools or a mix-match of hand-me-downs in your toolbox." Competitors generally refer to themselves as "Chumps".

In 2015, ChumpCar Canada was split off as a separate entity, although there is still close coordination between the US ChampCar Endurance Series and the Canadian ChumpCar organization. ChumpCar World Series began referring to itself as ChampCar Endurance Series in November 2017.

The races range in length from 6 to 38 hours.   Races are sanctioned throughout the United States, as well as in Canada and Mexico.

History 
ChumpCar World Series founder John Condren was the owner of Altamont Raceway Park in California when the first 24 Hours of LeMons events were held at the track. Condren entered a team in the early LeMons races, but was dissatisfied with the party atmosphere and tongue-in-cheek mockery that continues to characterize the LeMons series. After finding that other racers were interested in cheap endurance racing and shared his dissatisfaction with LeMons, Condren formed the ChumpCar World Series and organized the first ChumpCar race in October 2009 at Portland International Raceway. In the first full year of the series, ChumpCar hosted nine events across the United States at tracks that included Texas Motor Speedway, Iowa Speedway, Portland International Raceway, Hallett Motor Racing Circuit, and Putnam Park.

ChumpCar races resembled LeMons races in the beginning, as many LeMons teams participated in lavishly decorated cars and costumes. Likewise, many of the rules in ChumpCar mirrored those in LeMons to allow teams to easily switch between the two race series. Over time, ChumpCar's rules evolved to form a more coherent, distinct series unlike any other in North America. ChumpCar's popularity grew, and as of 2013 the series scheduled over 40 events across North America at some of the best-known road racing venues on the continent, including Mazda Raceway Laguna Seca, Sonoma Raceway (Sears Point), Road America, Virginia International Raceway, Watkins Glen, Road Atlanta and Daytona International Speedway.

Notable ChumpCar competitors include NASCAR Sprint Cup champion driver Tony Stewart, well known NASCAR teams Hendrick Motorsports and Roush Fenway Racing, and Ars Technica contributing writer Jonathan Gitlin.

In July 2014, ChumpCar reformed as a membership driven club, and 501(c)7 tax exempt organization.  Robert Mink is the CEO and board chair. 

In 2015, Chumpcar Canada was split off as a separate entity, although there is still close coordination between the US and Canadian organizations.

In June 2017, the CCWS BOD resigned and Micheal Chisek was made President of ChumpCar International, Inc. 

In 2017 ChumpCar World Series (ChumpCar International Inc.) adopted the name ChampCar Endurance Series and filed for trademark rights after receiving the blessings from the INDYCAR, LLC (the legal successor of Champ Car World Series) to use the name.

Preparation and rules 
To enter an event, competitors are required to select a vehicle from the Vehicle Performance Index list of cars located on the ChampCar website. Vehicles are listed with point values based on the stock vehicle's performance potential assigned to each model year. The table contains a large variety of makes and models to choose from. If the point value of the vehicle is less than 500, additional points may be spent on performance parts, as long as the total point calculation of vehicle plus performance parts does not exceed 500. This point calculation excludes required safety equipment, as well as maintenance and replacement of wear items with OEM or OEM-equivalent parts. No credit is given toward the point calculation of the vehicle for selling removed parts. Vehicles with a point calculation in excess of 500 are allowed to compete with penalty laps subtracted from their total. While the assessed vehicle point goal is 500, typical actual build costs can run anywhere from $4,000 to $10,000 to prep a car. Most of this budget is safety related such as brakes, roll cage, tires, racing seat, fire suppression system, and fuel cell.

The races run for a fixed length of time. The team that completes the most laps net of penalty laps is the winner.

The event organizers impose a complete set of safety rules that typically are on par with other road racing sanctioning bodies, including the Sports Car Club of America and National Auto Sport Association.

Tires are restricted to a UTQG treadwear rating of 180 or greater. Prior to July 2013, this value was 190. The change was made to allow for additional options in tire selection.

Cars must be 15 years or older to compete, other than those grandfathered. Vehicles are given a VPI or "Vehicle performance index".

Race format 
Events are held at major road racing tracks across the US. In the past, events were also held at major road racing tracks in Canada, along with a street race in Mexico.  The most common event format is a two-race weekend, with one eight-hour race each on Saturday and Sunday.  However, a variety of other formats are used, with lengths ranging from 10 to 24-hours.  Starts are picked by a random number generator utilizing the pit stall number. The order is reversed for the following days' race.  Teams are scored and ranked by the number of laps completed during the time allotted for the race net of penalty laps.

Teams are required to include at least two drivers (more for longer events).  Each driver is required to complete at least one hour in the car.  No stint is allowed to exceed two hours, with a minimum one hour rest.  Pit stops where fuel is added to the car are required to be at least five minutes in length to ensure safe refueling.

Awards 

The top three finishers on laps in each race are recognized with a trophy and a credit toward future participation in the series.  Top finishing teams are awarded "Race Credits" for discounts to future races.  Additional awards may be given for notably good (or bad) driving, especially dedicated repair work, or good overall spirit.  Overall spirit is specially recognized by the Spirit of ChampCar Award, given to the team in the race that the organizers feel best exemplifies the competitive spirit of the series.

In the past, drivers  were awarded a script known as "ChumpChange".  However, as of 2016, scripts are no longer handed out, due to counterfeiting.

Awards are made from repurposed automotive parts.

National Championship 
An annual National Championship event will be held at a track designated by the CEO. Sonoma Raceway, located in Sonoma California was chosen for the 2020 TireRack.com ChampCar Endurance Series National Championship. The race will take place on February 15 and 16, 2020. 
The 2021 TireRack.com ChampCar Endurance Series National Championship race will be held at Road America.

1.5.1. In order to qualify for the National Championship, a ChampCar team must:

a. Finish in the top 80 in points for the previous season.

b. Teams must compete in at least two (2) events in the previous season.

1.5.2. The winner of the National Championship:

a. All qualified teams carry their top two (2) season finish points into the Championship.

b. Finish points from the Championship will be added to the season point total.

c. Lowest point total wins the National Championship.

1.5.3. Bring the same car you raced to qualify for the Championship. No replacement cars shall be considered qualified, including significant changes to otherwise qualified vehicles.

1.5.4. A minimum of TWO (2) original team drivers must be a part of the Championship team.

1.5.5. Championship events are NOT exclusive – anyone can enter.

Past TireRack.com ChampCar Endurance Series National Championship Winners

2021 Results- https://speedhive.mylaps.com/Events/1974115

2021 Location - Ozarks International Raceway
2021 National Champion - Visceral Racing Group #959 1988 Porsche 944RSR

2020 Results- https://speedhive.mylaps.com/Sessions/5722332

2020 Location - Charlotte Motor Speedway Roval
2020 National Champion - RVA Graphics #111 1988 BMW E302019 Results- https://champcar.org/mainweb/pdf/2019RacingRadioNationalChampionshipResults.pdf

2019 Location - Charlotte Motor Speedway Roval
2019 National Champion - DamSon Racing #346 1999 BMW E46

2018 Results - https://champcar.org/mainweb/wp-content/uploads/2018/06/1397221586_2018NCMResults.pdf

2018 Location - NCM Motorsports Park
2018 National Champion - RVAGFX #111 1989 BMW 325

2017 season schedule

References

External links 
 Official Website
 ChampCar Online Forum
 ChampCar Rules
 ChampCar Race Schedule
 ChampCar Facebook Page
 ChampCar YouTube Channel

Auto races in the United States
Endurance motor racing